The 1888 Louisville Colonels season was a season in American baseball. The team finished with a 58–87 record, seventh place in the American Association.

Regular season

On June 7, shareholder Mordecai Davidson bought out most of the other shareholder, appointing himself president and John R. Botto vice-president. Two days later, he officially took over as manager as well. John Kerins, among others, served as team captain, guiding the team's on-field activities.

Season standings

Record vs. opponents

Opening Day lineup

Roster

Player stats

Batting

Starters by position
Note: Pos = Position; G = Games played; AB = At bats; H = Hits; Avg. = Batting average; HR = Home runs; RBI = Runs batted in

Other batters
Note: G = Games played; AB = At bats; H = Hits; Avg. = Batting average; HR = Home runs; RBI = Runs batted in

Pitching

Starting pitchers
Note: G = Games pitched; IP = Innings pitched; W = Wins; L = Losses; ERA = Earned run average; SO = Strikeouts

References
 1888 Louisville Colonels team page at Baseball Reference

Louisville Colonels seasons
Louisville Colonels season
Louisville Colonels